Brachyrrhipis is a genus of beetles in the family Callirhipidae. It was described by van Emden in 1931.

Species
 Brachyrrhipis tenuipes (Champion, 1896)
 Brachyrrhipis venosa (Champion, 1896)

References

Callirhipidae
Byrrhoidea genera